The Wolf and Fox Hunt is an oil-on-canvas painting by Peter Paul Rubens, executed c. 1616, now held in the Metropolitan Museum of Art in New York. It shows mounted and walking hunters chasing two wolves and three foxes. It marks the beginning of an intensive creative phase in which Rubens focused on the theme of hunting.

The painting was completed with the help of assistants, although the wolves were painted entirely by Rubens. By 1617 the canvas had been trimmed at the top and left to fit into a client's home.

Related subjects by Rubens

References

Paintings in the collection of the Metropolitan Museum of Art
Paintings by Peter Paul Rubens
1616 paintings
Dogs in art
Horses in art
Wolves in art
Foxes in art
Hunting in art